Amanah Wali (known by the abbreviation AW) is an Indonesian soap opera produced by MNC Pictures that premiered on May 27, 2017, at 02.45 WIB on RCTI. The soap opera is directed by Azhar Kinoi Lubis, Reka Wijaya, Viva Westy Datuk, Anto Agam, Dedi Setiadi, Kiky Zkr, Bobby Herlambang, Yogi Yose, Ronggur Sihombing (Alm.), Indrawan, Haekal Rizky Pratama, Asep Kusdinar Indrawan and Yorris Rumsayor and stars Wali Band.

In season 4 (May 3, 2020), the soap opera underwent a story overhaul and changes in the composition of the cast due to the COVID-19 Pandemic. The filming location was also forced to be changed because the situation was very unlikely to be done outdoors.

Media outputs

Seasons summary

Film TV (FTV) 

 Amanah Wali: Kakus Kasus

Acara Varietas 

 Dahsyat - Special Event Dahsyat - Dahsyatnya 600 Episode Amanah Wali 5 (September 4, 2021)

Synopsis

Season 1 
Four young men who are still searching for their identity. Apoy the market thug, Tomi the wild racer, Ovie the pickpocket, and Faank the punk busker. Their lives are far from normal, where each of them has their own unique side. Apoy, who is the market champion, is very vocal about extorting market traders for security reasons. But, behind that, he always shrinks and obeys if the voice of his mother's command is heard.

Season 2 
Faank, Ovie, Tomi, and Apoy after leaving the pesantren were not free from various problems. Apoy was heartbroken because someone else proposed to Wiyanti. Tomi was also heartbroken because April left him for Paris to continue her fashion studies. Faank's father had a heart attack and died because he misunderstood that Faank was still participating in a brawl. Ovie's business falters. Ovie's protégé Revan, who works as a cashier at Tomi's supermarket, misappropriates money.

Season 3 
Bilal (Rey Bong) is told as a subordinate of Yanto Kober's (Rachman Yacob) gang just like Apoy. While performing his actions, Bilal was caught by Mr. Ustadz Beling (Ray Shareza). Ustadz Beling immediately handed over to Faank cs to be educated and taken care of in order to become a teenager who understands religion. On the other hand, Faank cs must face their own problems.

Season 4

Original Version 
Faank, Ovie, Tomi and Apoy are on a mission to Cisayong Village to meet Ustadz Dullah who is an alumnus of Pesantren Annur. Faank, Ovie, Tomi and Apoy were assigned to help Ustadz Dullah improve the faith of the Cisayong Village Community which is still lacking.

New Version during Covid-19 Pandemic 
Apoy was asked by Bondan to help him teach the Makmur Market Merchants and Thugs who wanted to repent. In this market that sells used goods, Apoy, Faank, Tomi and Ovie take turns teaching prayers and reciting the Koran to the Makmur Market Merchants and Thugs who are far from religious knowledge.

However, not all merchants and thugs of the Makmur Market repented, many also refused and felt threatened by the presence of Apoy CS.

Besides that, Apoy also got into trouble at Genjing Market because there was a new grocery trader named Mr. Yusuf, Mr. Yusuf's way of trading was to mention capital and pay as much as possible, this was hated by several traders in Genjing Market because it caused losses to other grocery traders. They asked Apoy for help to deal with these grocery traders.

In addition to telling the story of the repentant thugs and the Genjing Market problem, this soap opera is also spiced up with a romance story between Faank and Fatin from the previous season.

Season 5 
Faank, Apoy, Ovie, and Tomy went together to proselytize. But when Tomy was about to return to Genjing market, he saw someone he thought was being robbed. She is Lela (Salshabilla Adriani), a resident of Ujung village. When Lela is intercepted by a group of thugs, one of whom is Digo (Alfie Alfandy). Digo forces Lela to hand over her motorcycle, which has not yet been paid off, while Tomy sees the incident and immediately helps Lela.

Season 6 
It started with the arrest of a grandfather named Munadi because he was accused of stealing. However, it turned out that he had been framed.

Furthermore, Faank and his friends immediately helped in solving the problem. After that, they went to the village of Ranca Kalong to return the community to the right path because of the faith that was almost lost and were assisted by people in the An-Nur pesantren.

FTV (Amanah Wali: Kakus Kasus) 
Nurdin (Rifky Balweel) returns to his hometown accompanied by Ovie (Hamzah Shopi). Nurdin intends to improve the image of his former togel enthusiast who has now repented.

Pemeran

References

External links 

 Situs web MNC Pictures
 
 

2017 Indonesian television series debuts
2010s Indonesian television series debuts
Indonesian television series
Ramadan special television shows
RCTI original programming